Gilda Casanova (born December 19, 1995) is a Cuban sprinter who specializes in the 400 metres.

She won the silver medal at the 2014 World Junior Championships and finished fifth (in the 800 metres) at the 2015 NACAC Championships.

In the 4 × 400 metres relay she won a gold medal at the 2014 Central American and Caribbean Games, finished fourth at the 2015 Pan American Games, and won another gold medal at the 2018 Central American and Caribbean Games. She also competed at the 2016 Summer Olympics. In the 4 × 800 metres relay she finished fourth at the 2015 IAAF World Relays.

Her personal best times are 52.28 seconds in the 400 metres, achieved in May 2014 in Port of Spain; and 2:02.50 minutes in the 800 metres, achieved in June 2014 in Havana.

References

1995 births
Living people
Cuban female sprinters
Cuban female middle-distance runners
Olympic athletes of Cuba
Athletes (track and field) at the 2016 Summer Olympics
Athletes (track and field) at the 2015 Pan American Games
Pan American Games competitors for Cuba
Central American and Caribbean Games gold medalists for Cuba
Competitors at the 2014 Central American and Caribbean Games
Central American and Caribbean Games medalists in athletics
Olympic female sprinters
20th-century Cuban women
20th-century Cuban people
21st-century Cuban women